, who is also known as Shunkō II, was a designer of books and ukiyo-e style Japanese woodblock prints.  He was born in 1762 and designed prints from about 1805 to about 1821.  He initially studied with the Rimpa school artist Tsutsumi Tōrin III.  In 1806 or 1807, Shunsen became a student of Katsukawa Shun'ei, and changed his name from “Kojimachi Shunsen” to “Katsukawa Shunsen”.  In 1820 he succeeded Katsukawa Shunkō I, becoming Katsukawa Shunkō II.  In the late 1820s, he ceased producing woodblock prints and devoted himself to painting ceramics.  He died about 1830.

Shunsen is best known for his genre scenes, landscapes, and prints of beautiful women.

Gallery

References
Lane, Richard. (1978).  Images from the Floating World, The Japanese Print. Oxford: Oxford University Press. ;  OCLC 5246796
Newland, Amy Reigle. (2005). Hotei Encyclopedia of Japanese Woodblock Prints.  Amsterdam: Hotei. ;  OCLC 61666175 
Roberts, Laurance P. (1976). A Dictionary of Japanese Artists. New York: Weatherhill. ;  OCLC 2005932 

1762 births
1830s deaths
Katsukawa school